The men's 400 metres at the 2009 World Championships in Athletics was held at the Olympic Stadium on 18, 19 and 21 August.

The United States had a strong tradition in the event, with an American topping the Olympic 400 m podium every time since the 1988 Olympics. Similar to the 2007 World Championships, Jeremy Wariner and LaShawn Merritt were the clear favourites. However, on this occasion recent form favoured the Olympic champion Merritt instead of the reigning world champion Wariner. Both Americans were undefeated that season but Merritt held the world-leading time of 44.50 seconds. A gold or silver medallist outside of these two competitors seemed unlikely; Bahamian Chris Brown, Irishman David Gillick, Frenchman Leslie Djhone and the other two runners from the United States (Gil Roberts and Lionel Larry) were seen to be capable of a bronze at best.

On the first day, Ramon Miller surprised as the fastest qualifier in the heats, scoring a new personal best of 45 seconds. Tabarie Henry, Djhone and Renny Quow were the next fastest, and African record holder Gary Kikaya was most high-profile casualty of the first round, having been disqualified for a lane infraction.

Medalists

Records
Prior to the competition, the established records were as follows.

Qualification standards

Schedule

Results

Heats
Qualification: First 3 in each heat(Q) and the next 3 fastest(q) advance to the semifinals.

Key:  NR = National record, PB = Personal best, Q = qualification by place in heat, q = qualification by overall place, SB = Seasonal best

Semifinals
First 2 in each semifinal(Q) and the next 2 fastest(q) advance to the final.

Final

References
General
400 metres results. IAAF. Retrieved on 2009-08-18.
Specific

400 metres
400 metres at the World Athletics Championships